Hoppy Serves a Writ is a 1943 Western film directed by George Archainbaud and starring William Boyd as Hopalong Cassidy, the 43rd of 66 Cassidy features. The supporting cast features his regular sidekicks Andy Clyde and Jay Kirby, as well as Victor Jory and George Reeves. The film remains noteworthy today as one of the earliest performances (his 2nd) of unshaven newcomer Robert Mitchum, who made an impression upon the studio by generating a surprising fan mail response exactly as Clark Gable had after playing an extremely similar unshaven role in The Painted Desert, a Western starring William Boyd produced a dozen years earlier.

Plot

Cattle rustler and stagecoach hold-up man Tom Jordan and his gang have been terrorizing the ranchers and other citizens of Mason City. Sheriff Hoppy is implored to bring them to justice, but their hideout is across the border in Oklahoma, outside his jurisdiction. With somewhat questionable help from sidekicks California and Johnny, he has to figure out a way to capture and arrest Jordan and his henchmen while they're committing crimes in Texas.

It was adapted from "Hopalong Cassidy Serves a Writ" (1941), the final Cassidy novel written by creator Clarence E. Mulford.

Cast
William Boyd as Hopalong Cassidy
Andy Clyde	as California Carlson
Jay Kirby as Johnny Travers
Victor Jory as Tom Jordan
George Reeves as Steve Jordan
Jan Christy as Jean Hollister
Hal Taliaferro	as Henchman Greg Jordan
Forbes Murray as Ben Hollister
Robert Mitchum as Henchman 
Byron Foulger as Danvers 
Earle Hodgins as Bartender, Desk Clerk
Roy Barcroft as Rancher Tod Colby

References

External links
 Hoppy Serves a Writ in the Internet Movie Database

1943 films
American black-and-white films
1943 Western (genre) films
American Western (genre) films
Hopalong Cassidy films
Films directed by George Archainbaud
1940s English-language films
1940s American films